The 1995 Tour de Pologne was the 52nd edition of the Tour de Pologne cycle race and was held from 3 September to 10 September 1995. The race started in Zgierz and finished in Warsaw. The race was won by Zbigniew Spruch.

General classification

References

1995
Tour de Pologne
Tour de Pologne